Sanborn is a hamlet (and census-designated place, population: 1,645 in 2010 census) in the Towns of Cambria, Lewiston, and Wheatfield, in Niagara County, New York, United States, on the southern side of the intersection of New York State Route 429 and New York State Route 31. Originally called South Pekin after the formerly thriving hamlet of Pekin to the north, Sanborn was renamed in 1866 after Ebenezer Sanborn. The ZIP code for Sanborn is 14132.

Sanborn is the home of Niagara County Community College.

Points of interest
 St. Andrews Lutheran Cemetery
 St. Peter's Lutheran Church and School
 Niagara Escarpment, from which one can sometimes view Lake Ontario and Toronto.

Notable people
 Nellie Moyer Budd, music teacher

References

External links 
 Town of Cambria

Census-designated places in New York (state)
Census-designated places in Niagara County, New York
Hamlets in Niagara County, New York
Hamlets in New York (state)
Lewiston (town), New York